Notre Dame of Surala (NDS) is a private Catholic school in Surallah, South Cotabato founded by the Passionist Fathers in 1967 and administered by the Sisters of St. Paul de Chartres. Notre Dame of Surala is a member of the Notre Dame Educational Association in the Philippines.

History

Notre Dame of Surala was founded in 1967 at the request of Catholic parents of Surala, South Cotabato to ensure the Christian formation of their children within the context of the academic program.

Reverend Raymond Pulvino, C.P., founded the school and was responsible for the quick building of the school. The passionist fathers gave him support and financial backing. The school is owned by the Congregation of the Passion of Our Lord Jesus Christ in the Philippines.

The passionist fathers intended NDS to serve, that is, the school will not be a profit-making venture; it will render service to as many pupils as it can accommodate; hence, there will be no screening.

Schools in South Cotabato
Notre Dame Educational Association